Israel women's national under-19 football team is the football team representing Israel in competitions for under-19 year old players and is controlled by the Israel Football Association. The team hosted the 2015 UEFA Women's Under-19 Championship, making its first appearance in a major tournament.

Competitive record

UEFA Women's Under-19 Championship

References

External links
Women U-19 @ Israeli Football Association

F
Youth football in Israel
Women's national under-19 association football teams